A visit to the Anthony Burgess Center is a rewarding way to explore the French city of Angers and honor one of England's greatest writers. The center is dedicated to the memory of 20th-century English novelist Anthony Burgess.

The Anthony Burgess Center was established in France in 1998 to honor the 20th-century English novelist. The center contains materials that celebrate the life and work of Burgess, including his novels, and correspondence. Many of these items were donated by Burgess's second wife, Liana, and can be studied by scholars and visitors. The Anthony Burgess Center also publishes the "Anthothy Burgess Newsletter" that is distributed internationally.

The Anthony Burgess Center have relations with The International Anthony Burgess Foundation founded to keep and preserve the work of Anthony Burgess.

The Burgess Center is home to an extensive archive and library. It also has a study center and exhibition space, and hosts conferences, workshops, and films. The centre also has a cafe where you can purchase current editions of Burgess books. The Engine House is open from 10am to 2pm Monday-Friday, and the archives are open only by appointment.

References

External links
Archive list of items
The Anthony Burgess Center

Anthony Burgess